First Dates Canada is the Canadian version of the international reality television series First Dates.

References

2016 Canadian television series debuts
2010s Canadian reality television series
Canadian dating and relationship reality television series
English-language television shows